Javier de Viana may refer to 
 Javier de Viana, a populated centre in the Artigas Department of northern Uruguay
 Javier de Viana (author) (1868–1926), Uruguayan writer
 Francisco Javier de Viana (1764–1820), Argentine sailor, soldier, and political figure